The Hohneck is, at  the third highest summit of the Vosges Mountains (after Grand Ballon [] and Storkenkopf []) and the highest point of Lorraine. On its summit stands a mountain hut, clearly visible in the distance. Nearby the mountain's top is located the ski resort of La Bresse Hohneck.

Geography 
The mountain is divided between the French municipalities of La Bresse (dep. of Vosges), Metzeral (department of Haut-Rhin) and Stosswihr (department of Haut-Rhin).

On a clear day from the Hohneck summit is possible to spot not just the entire Vosges range but also the Black Forest, the Jura, a good part of the Swiss Alps and, in the distance, the Mont Blanc.

History 

The Hohneck area has been up to the 19th century the main connection route between Gérardmer and Munster, before the opening of the col de la Schlucht road. Therefore, not faraway from the summit have been found ruins dating back to the Thirty Years' War and re-used during Napoleon's military champaigns.

A tramway line from Gérardmer to the Hohneck operated between July 25, 1897 and August 28, 1939. From the Alsace side of the mountain a rack railway reached the Hohneck from Munster passing through the col de la Schlucht between 1907 and 1914.

Access to the summit 

The well known Route des Crêtes (French for road of the peaks) transits not faraway from the top of the mountain, which can be reached by car following a small asphalted branch.

Bibliography 
 Une Montagne vosgienne : le Hohneck, Guy-Jean Michel; Institut coopératif de l'École moderne, Imprimerie Merle et Cie, Grasse, 1963 
 Guide du botaniste au Hohneck et aux environs de Géradmer, C. Brunotte and C. Lemasson, Coubé, 1921
 La Bresse-Le Hohneck, clins d'oeils sur l'histoire, Imprimerie Sailley, Le Thillot, 1995

External links
Webcam on the mountain's top

See also
 Grand Ballon
 Kastelberg
 Vosges Mountains

References 

Mountains of Vosges (department)
Mountains of Haut-Rhin
Mountains of the Vosges
One-thousanders of France